R329 road may refer to:
 R329 road (Ireland)
 R329 road (South Africa)